HMS Orford was an  which served in the Royal Navy during the First World War. The M class were an improvement on the previous , capable of higher speed. The vessel was launched on 19 April 1916 and joined the Grand Fleet. Orford spent much of the war undertaking anti-submarine warfare patrols and escorting convoys across the Atlantic Ocean. Although based at Scapa Flow, the destroyer ranged far, often operating off the coast of Cornwall and even having a temporary transfer to Buncrana in Ireland in 1917. In 1918, the destroyer took part in one of the final sorties of the Grand Fleet, but saw no action. After the Armistice that marked the end of the First World War, Orford was placed in reserve, decommissioned and, on 31 October 1921, sold to be broken up.

Design and development
Orford was one of twenty-two  destroyers ordered by the British Admiralty in November 1914 as part of the Third War Construction Programme.

Armament consisted of three single  Mk IV QF guns on the ship's centreline, with one on the forecastle, one aft on a raised platform and one between the middle and aft funnels. A single 2-pounder (40 mm) pom-pom anti-aircraft gun was carried, while torpedo armament consisted of two twin mounts for  torpedoes. The ship had a complement of 76 officers and ratings.

Construction and career
Laid down at their shipyard in Sunderland, Orford was launched by William Doxford & Sons on 19 April 1916 and completed during December that year. The destroyer was the seventh Royal Navy ship to have the name. The ship recalled Admiral Edward Russell, 1st Earl of Orford, who fought at the Battles of Barfleur and La Hougue. The vessel was deployed as part of the Grand Fleet, joining the Fourteenth Destroyer Flotilla at Scapa Flow.

The destroyer was active in anti-submarine warfare, both independently and as part of an escort for convoys. The destroyer often patrolled as far as the coast of Cornwall. On 1 February 1917, Orford spotted the German submarine , which had just attacked the Norwegian freighter SS Ramsholm]. Before the submarine could sink the already evacuated ship, Orford opened fire and drove the submarine under the surface. The destroyer then dropped a pattern of four depth charges, but the submarine escaped. On 6 March, Orford formed part of the escort for convoys sailing between the UK and France. Sometimes escorting and patrolling duties were combined. By this point, Orford had been detached from the Flotilla and was serving with the Southern Division of the Coast of Ireland Station. The destroyer rejoined the flotilla, however, soon afterwards. On 17 October, the destroyer formed part of the shield for the 4th Light Cruiser Squadron during the Action off Lerwick, but took no active part in the action. Orford subsequently took part in the Royal Navy's engagement with one of the final sorties of the German High Seas Fleet during the First World War, on 24 April 1918, although the two fleets did not actually meet and the destroyer returned unharmed.

After the armistice, the Grand Fleet was disbanded and Orford was placed in reserve at the Nore on 17 October 1919. However, the harsh conditions of wartime service, exacerbated by the fact that the hull was not galvanised and operations often required high speed in high seas, meant that the destroyer was worn out and ready for retirement. Orford was decommissioned, sold to W & A.T. Burden on 31 October 1921 to be broken up.

Pennant numbers

References

Citations

Bibliography

 
 
 
 
 
 
 
 
 
 
 
 

1916 ships
Admiralty M-class destroyers
Ships built on the River Wear
World War I destroyers of the United Kingdom